Fixer: The Taking of Ajmal Naqshbandi is a documentary by Ian Olds that shows the kidnapping of Italian journalist Daniele Mastrogiacomo and interpreter Ajmal Naqshbandi and the events leading to the release of the former and the murder of the latter by the Taliban.  Olds won Best New Documentary Filmmaker 2009 at the Tribeca Film Festival for the film.

See also
 List of journalists killed during the War in Afghanistan (2001–2021)

References

External links 
 Fixer: The Taking of Ajmal Naqshbandi - video report by Democracy Now!
 Fixer: The Taking of Ajmal Naqshbandi at HBO
 

2009 documentary films
Documentary films about jihadism
Documentary films about journalists
Documentary films about the War in Afghanistan (2001–2021)
2009 films
American documentary films
2000s American films